Liberec is a city in the Czech Republic. It has about 103,000 inhabitants and it is the fifth-largest city in the country. It lies on the Lusatian Neisse, in a basin surrounded by mountains. The city centre is well preserved and is protected by law as an urban monument zone.

Liberec was once home to a thriving textile industry and hence nicknamed the "Manchester of Bohemia". For many Czechs, Liberec is mostly associated with the city's dominant Ještěd Tower. Since the end of the 19th century, the city has been a conurbation with the suburb of Vratislavice nad Nisou and the neighbouring city of Jablonec nad Nisou. Therefore, the total area with suburbs encompasses 150,000 inhabitants.

Administrative parts

Liberec is made up of 32 city parts and one self-governing borough (Vratislavice nad Nisou).

Liberec I-Staré Město
Liberec II-Nové Město
Liberec III-Jeřáb
Liberec IV-Perštýn
Liberec V-Kristiánov
Liberec VI-Rochlice
Liberec VII-Horní Růžodol
Liberec VIII-Dolní Hanychov
Liberec IX-Janův Důl
Liberec X-Františkov
Liberec XI-Růžodol I
Liberec XII-Staré Pavlovice
Liberec XIII-Nové Pavlovice
Liberec XIV-Ruprechtice
Liberec XV-Starý Harcov
Liberec XVI-Nový Harcov
Liberec XVII-Kateřinky
Liberec XVIII-Karlinky
Liberec XIX-Horní Hanychov
Liberec XX-Ostašov
Liberec XXI-Rudolfov
Liberec XXII-Horní Suchá
Liberec XXIII-Doubí
Liberec XXIV-Pilínkov
Liberec XXV-Vesec
Liberec XXVIII-Hluboká
Liberec XXIX-Kunratice
Liberec XXX-Vratislavice nad Nisou
Liberec XXXI-Krásná Studánka
Liberec XXXII-Radčice
Liberec XXXIII-Machnín
Liberec XXXIV-Bedřichovka
Liberec XXXV-Karlov pod Ještědem

In the early 1990s, some parts became independent municipalities: Stráž nad Nisou (formerly Liberec XXVI-Stráž nad Nisou and Liberec XXVII-Svárov), Dlouhý Most (formerly Liberec XXXVI-Dlouhý Most), Jeřmanice (formerly Liberec XXXVII-Jeřmanice) and Šimonovice (formerly Liberec XXXVIII-Minkovice and Liberec XXXIX-Šimonovice).

Etymology
The oldest known names of the city are German, Reychinberch (1352) and Reychmberg (1369), meaning "rich/resourceful mountain" (reicher Berg in modern German). It was also spelled Reichenberg (1385–1399) and Rychmberg (1410).

The Czech equivalent originated as a distortion: Rychberk (1545), Libercum (1634), Liberk (1790), and finally Liberec (1845). In Czech, words starting with "R" were often dissimilated into "L". Since then, the city was known as Liberec in Czech and as Reichenberg in German.

Geography
Most of the municipal territory lies in the Zittau Basin. In the northeast, the territory extends into the Jizera Mountains and to the eponymous protected landscape area.

Liberec is situated on the Lusatian Neisse River. The largest body of water is Harcov Reservoir (also called Liberec Dam). The reservoir is located inside the built-up area on the Lusatian Neisse's tributary, the Harcovský Stream. Today it serves mainly as a recreational place for the residents of Liberec, but it was originally designed to protect the city from floods and as a water reservoir for industrial use. It is also important as a biotope with the occurrence of protected animals.

Climate
Liberec has a humid continental climate (Köppen Dfb).

History

11th–16th centuries
In the 11th or 12th century, a settlement named Habersdorf, which was the predecessor of Liberec, was established on the trade route from Bohemia to Lusatia by Czech settlers and German colonizers. In the 13th century, the second settlement named Reichenberg was established near the first one. The two settlements later merged. The first written mention of Liberec under its German name Reichenberg is from 1352.

From 1278, the area was owned by the noble Bieberstein family. Reichenberg suffered from the march of troops during the Hussite Wars, then it was burned down in 1469 during the battles with the army of King George of Poděbrady. After the Biebersteins died out, the Frýdlant estate which included Reichenberg was bought by the Redern family in 1558. The Rederns contributed significantly to the development of the settlement as they built new buildings, modernized the settlement and laid the foundation of the textile industry. In 1577, Reichenberg was promoted to a town by Emperor Rudolf II. He gave the town the coat of arms it still uses today.

17th–19th centuries
From 1600, the town was administered by Kateřina of Redern, who obtained the right to trade in salt for the town, had a chapel added to the castle and contributed to the construction of the town hall. When the Redern family was forced to leave Reichenberg after the Battle of White Mountain (1620), it was acquired by Albrecht von Wallenstein. After his death it belonged to the Gallas and Clam Gallas families, who didn't care much about the town. The prosperous local industry was interrupted by the Thirty Years' War and a great plague in 1680. The crises resulted in a series of harshly suppressed serf uprisings.

In the 18th century, Reichenberg flourished. The number of inhabitants tripled and the cloth industry was very successful. The Battle of Reichenberg between Austria and Prussia occurred nearby in 1757 during the Seven Years' War, but the town continued to develop. During the 19th century, the town became the centre of textile industry in the entile Austria-Hungary. In 1850, it became a self-governing city.

Reichenberg became a rich industrial city without representative buildings. In the late 19th century, a spectacular collection of representative buildings was created, mostly in the neo-Renaissance style: the city hall, the opera house, the North Bohemian Museum, the Old Synagogue, and others. A representative villa district and a forest with a botanical garden and a zoo were created.

20th century
Until 1918, the city was part of the Kingdom of Bohemia, Austrian monarchy (Austrian side after the compromise of 1867), seat of the Reichenberg district, one of the 94 Bezirkshauptmannschaften in Bohemia. After the end of World War I, Austria-Hungary fell apart and the Czechs of Bohemia joined newly established Czechoslovakia on 29 October 1918 whilst the Germans wanted to stay with Austria to form reduced German Austria on 12 November 1918, both citing Woodrow Wilson's Fourteen Points and the doctrine of self-determination. Liberec was declared the capital of the German-Austrian province of German Bohemia. Czechs however argued that these lands, though German-settled since the Middle Ages, were historically an integral part of the Duchy and Kingdom of Bohemia. On 16 December 1918, the Czechoslovak Army entered Liberec and the whole province remained part of Bohemia.

In the 1920s and the 1930s, Liberec became the unofficial capital of Germans in Czechoslovakia, a position was underlined by the foundation of important institutions such as Bücherei der Deutschen, a central German library in Czechoslovakia, and by failed efforts to relocate the German section of the Charles University there from Prague.

The Great Depression devastated the economy of the area with its textile, carpet, glass and other light industry. The high number of unemployed people, hunger, fear of the future and dissatisfaction with the Prague government led to the flash rise of the populist Sudeten German Party (SdP), founded by Konrad Henlein, born in the suburbs of Liberec. Whilst he declared fidelity to the Republic, he secretly negotiated with Adolf Hitler. In 1937 he radicalized his views and became Hitler's puppet in order to incorporate the Sudetenland into Germany and destabilize Czechoslovakia, which was an ally of France and one of the leading arms producers in Europe.

The city became the centre of Pan-German movements and later of the Nazis, especially after the 1935 election, despite its important democratic mayor, Karl Kostka (German Democratic Freedom Party). The final change came in Summer 1938, after the radicalization of the terror of the SdP, whose death threats forced Kostka and his family to flee to Prague.

In September 1938, after two unsuccessful attempts by the SdP to stage a pro-Nazi coup in Czechoslovakia, which were stopped by police and the army, the Munich Agreement awarded the city to Nazi Germany and it became the capital of Reichsgau Sudetenland. Until 1945, the city was administered as a part of the Regierungsbezirk Aussig of Reichsgau Sudetenland. Most of the city's Jewish and Czech population fled to the rest of Czechoslovakia or were expelled. The important synagogue was burned down. Henlein himself confiscated a villa in Liberec that had belonged to a Jewish businessman, which remained Henlein's home until 1945. During a rally in December 1938, Hitler laid out the future of the Hitler Youth.

After World War II, the city again became a part of Czechoslovakia and nearly all of the city's German population was expelled following the Beneš decrees. The region was then resettled with Czechs, completely altering the traditional language and culture of the city and its region. The city continues to have an important German minority, consisting of descendants of anti-Nazi Germans who were active in the struggle against Hitler, as well as Germans from Czech–German families and their descendants. Liberec also has a Jewish minority with a newly built synagogue and a Greek minority, originating from Communist refugees who settled there after the Greek Civil War in 1949.

Demographics

Transport

Liberec city transport provides bus and tram lines. The first tram was used in Liberec in 1897. Liberec shares the  tramway line which connects it to its neighbouring city, Jablonec nad Nisou which is 12 km away. There are also two city lines with : The first connects Horní Hanychov (next to the cable car to Ještěd) and Lidové Sady via Fügnerova. The second connects Dolní Hanychov and Lidové Sady via Fügnerova (only during workdays). There are also four historical trams. In the city centre there are two tracks as a memorial, in the past trams were used also on the central place in front of the city hall.

The European route E442 passes through Liberec.

A private international airport is located in the Liberec part of Ostašov.

Education and science

Technical University of Liberec was founded in 1953 as " University of Mechanical Engineering in Liberec". After the number of fields has grown, in 1995, the university was renamed. It is known especially for its research in the field of textile engineering. It has about 9,000 students in 6 faculties (Mechanical Engineering, Textile Engineering, Arts and Architecture, Mechatronics Informatics and Inter-Disciplinary Studies, Science-Humanities and Education, and Economics), and it also comprises Institute for Nanomaterials, Advanced Technologies and Innovation.

Regional Research Library in Liberec is a general public science library, aiming at general education in the region. Founded in 1900, based on the decision of the municipal council to establish a municipal library. It has an exceptional collection of Germano-Slavica and Sudetica (periodicals and books in German language from Bohemia). New building was completed in 2000 on the site of the Old Synagogue, which was burnt down by the Nazis in November 1938. Its building comprises also a modern New Synagogue.

Culture
Mateřinka is a theatre festival held biennially in June.

Sport

The city is home to FC Slovan Liberec, a football club founded in Liberec which plays in the Czech First League, the top tier. Slovan Liberec is one of the most successful clubs in the Czech Republic, having won three league titles. There is also SK VTJ Rapid Liberec. It plays in one of the lowest divisions. 

The ice hockey team HC Bílí Tygři Liberec play in the Czech Extraliga, the national top tier. It plays in Home Credit Arena.

Liberec has hosted two European Luge Championships, having done so in 1914 and 1939. In 2009, it hosted the FIS Nordic World Ski Championships. The Ski Jumping World Cup always comes to Liberec in January. The World Karate Championships took place in May 2011.

In 2015, from 15 to 23 August, Liberec played host to the 2015 World Mountain Bike Orienteering Championships (WMTBOC).

Sights

Liberec's prominent buildings are the City Hall (1893), the Liberec Castle (Liberecký zámek), built in the 16th century, and the Ještěd Tower (1968) upon the Ještěd Mountain, build by architect Karel Hubáček, which became a symbol of the city. Václav Havel held a broadcast from the site of the tower in 1968; a plaque beside the tower marks this event.

Contemporary buildings of note are also to be found, primarily the work of the firm SIAL, and include the new Regional Research Library (2000) and the Česká Pojišťovna office building (1997). Neo-Renaissance F. X. Šalda theatre was built in 1871–1872. Centrum Babylon Liberec include a large water park, an amusement park, a casino, shopping court and hotel.

The North Bohemian Museum was built in 1873. It ranks among the oldest and most significant museums of nature sciences, arts and crafts in the Czech Republic. There is the sculpture of T. G. Masaryk from 2010 standing in front of the Museum.

Zoo and botanical garden

The Liberec Zoo was the first to be opened in Czechoslovakia in 1904. The zoo contains a wide variety of fauna (about 143 species on 13 ha), including large mammals like elephants, giraffes, sea lions and white tigers, which are a genetic anomaly and hence very rare. It participates in breeding activities of endangered species to help preserve the gene pool.

It continues the legacy of a botanical garden established in 1876 by the Verein der Naturfreunde ("Society of Friends of Nature") on a nearby site and it is therefore considered the oldest one in the Czech Republic.

Notable people

Christoph Demantius (1567–1643), German composer and poet
Joachim Johann Nepomuk Spalowsky (1752–1797), Austrian naturalist
Josef Proksch (1794–1864), composer and teacher of Bedřich Smetana
Friedrich Karl Ginzel (1850–1926), Austrian astronomer
Heinrich Herkner (1863–1932), German economist
Ferdinand Porsche (1875–1951), Austrian-Czech car designer
Vlasta Burian (1891–1962), actor
Edmund Nick (1891–1973), German composer
Jaroslav Řídký (1897–1956), composer
Konrad Henlein (1898–1945), German Nazi politician
Arthur Beer (1900–1980), German astronomer
Harald Kreutzberg (1902–1968), German dancer and choreographer
Herbert Feigl (1902–1988), Austrian-American philosopher
Guido Beck (1903–1989), Argentinian physicist
Augustin Schramm (1907–1948), communist politician and officer
Roderich Menzel (1907–1987), Czech-German tennis player
Fritz Preissler (1908–1948), German luger
Egon Hartmann (1919–2009), German architect
Otfried Preußler (1923–2013), German writer
Roland Bulirsch (1932–2022), German mathematician
Markus Lüpertz (born 1941), German artist
Barbara Bouchet (born 1944), German-American actress and entrepreneur
Jirina Marton (born 1946), Canadian artist and illustrator
Oldřich Kaiser (born 1955), actor
Vladimír Šlechta (born 1960), writer 
Jaroslav Nedvěd (born 1969), ice hockey player
Petr Nedvěd (born 1971), ice hockey player
Martin Damm (born 1972), tennis player
Tomáš Enge (born 1976), F1 driver
Jan Víšek (born 1981), ice hockey player
Yemi A.D. (born 1981), choreographer and artist
Lukáš Derner (born 1983), ice hockey player
Pavla Havlíková (born 1983), cyclist
Zuzana Hejnová (born 1986), athlete
Martin Cikl (born 1987), ski jumper

Twin towns – sister cities

Liberec is twinned with:
 Amersfoort, Netherlands
 Augsburg, Germany

 Nahariya, Israel
 Zittau, Germany

Gallery

References

External links

 
Official tourist portal
Facebook page
Tramway Liberec 
Liberec Botanical Garden
Liberec Zoo
Oblastni galerie v Liberci (Museum of art)

 
Cities and towns in the Czech Republic
Populated places in Liberec District
Holocaust locations in Czechoslovakia